CoreFiling Limited (trading as DecisionSoft Limited until 2009) is a private limited software house based in Oxford, UK. Its product-range enables creation, validation, search, filing and audit of XBRL/iXBRL documents. Its products are used by financial regulators and financial institutions. Its products are sold directly and through resellers including BDO International, Unit4, and IRIS Software. It is a member of the XBRL Consortium.

iXBRL

Philip Allen of CoreFiling invented the inline XBRL markup standard that is now required by regulators such as HMRC.

Open source

CoreFiling maintain a number of open-source BSD licensed XML tools including a pretty-printer, differ, and schema validator.

References

1997 establishments in the United Kingdom
Software companies of the United Kingdom
Software companies established in 1997
Companies established in 1997
Companies based in Oxford